Presidential primary elections were held in Uruguay on 27 June 2004 in order to nominate the presidential candidate for every political party.

Candidates
National Party
This was almost the only party with competitive primaries:
Jorge Larrañaga (winner)
Luis Alberto Lacalle
Cristina Maeso
Broad Front–Progressive Encounter
One of the most important parties in terms of voter preferences, it had already decided to have only one candidate:
Tabaré Vázquez (unopposed)
Colorado Party
The main candidate had already been decided between the most important political factions:
Guillermo Stirling (winner)
Alberto Iglesias
Ricardo Lombardo
Manuel Flores Silva
Eisenhower Cardoso
Jorge Ruiz
Gustavo Boquete
Independent Party
Pablo Mieres (unopposed)
Intransigent Party
Víctor Lissidini (unopposed)
Civic Union
Aldo Lamorte (unopposed)
Liberal Party
Julio Vera (winner)
Ramón Díaz
José Curotto
Workers' Party 
Rafael Fernández (unopposed)

See also

 2004 Uruguayan general election

References

External links

2004
2004 elections in South America
2004 in Uruguay
June 2004 events in South America
Tabaré Vázquez